Port Warren is an unincorporated community located within Greenwich Township in Warren County, New Jersey.

Inclined Plane 9 West of the Morris Canal was located here. It was the largest plane of the canal and also one of only three double-track planes. The plane tender's house is now the Jim and Mary Lee Morris Canal Museum. The interaction of the Lopatcong Creek with the canal resulted in building an overflow and waste weir downstream of the inclined plane.

Gallery

References

External links
 
 
 
 

Greenwich Township, Warren County, New Jersey
Unincorporated communities in Warren County, New Jersey
Unincorporated communities in New Jersey